Elsa Georgia Cocquerel is an Australian actress and model. She is known for her role as Michelle Scott in the Stan horror series Wolf Creek (2017), for which she was nominated for a Logie Award.

Early life and education
Cocquerel was born to Australian mother and French father. Her brother Thomas and two sisters Emilie and Anna are also actors. Cocquerel attended Pymble Ladies' College. She began her studies in Fashion Design at the University of Technology Sydney. She returned to university to complete a Bachelor of Business in Marketing at Swinburne University of Technology in 2020.

She was a model before turning to acting in her early twenties.

Filmography

References

External links
 

Living people
21st-century Australian actresses
Actresses from Sydney
Australian female models
Australian film actresses
Australian people of French descent
Australian television actresses
Models from Sydney
People educated at Pymble Ladies' College
People from the North Shore, Sydney
Swinburne University of Technology alumni
University of Technology Sydney alumni